Although it is toxic in large doses, selenium is an essential micronutrient for animals. In plants, it sometimes occurs in toxic amounts as forage, e.g. locoweed. Selenium is a component of the amino acids selenocysteine and selenomethionine. In humans, selenium is a trace element nutrient that functions as cofactor for glutathione peroxidases and certain forms of thioredoxin reductase. Selenium-containing proteins are produced from inorganic selenium via the intermediacy of selenophosphate (PSeO33−).

Se-containing biomolecules

Selenium is an essential micronutrient in mammals, but is also recognized as toxic in excess. Selenium exerts its biological functions through selenoproteins, which contain the amino acid selenocysteine. Twenty-five selenoproteins are encoded in the human genome.

Glutathione peroxidase
The glutathione peroxidase family of enzymes (abbreviated GSH-Px) catalyze reduction of hydrogen peroxide and organic hydroperoxides:

2GSH + H2O2   →   GSSG  +  2 H2O
The two H atoms are donated by thiols in a process that begins with oxidation of a selenol side chain in GSH-Px.  The organoselenium compound ebselen is a drug used to supplement the action of GSH-Px.  It functions as a catalyst for the destruction of hydrogen peroxide.

A related selenium-containing enzyme in some plants and in animals (thioredoxin reductase) generates reduced thioredoxin, a dithiol that serves as an electron source for peroxidases and also the important reducing enzyme ribonucleotide reductase that makes DNA precursors from RNA precursors.

Deiodinases
Selenium also plays a role in the functioning of the thyroid gland.  It participates as a cofactor for the three thyroid hormone deiodinases.  These enzymes activate and then deactivate various thyroid hormones and their metabolites. It may inhibit Hashimoto's disease, an auto-immune disease in which the body's own thyroid cells are attacked by the immune system. A reduction of 21% on TPO antibodies was reported with the dietary intake of 0.2 mg of selenium.

Formate dehydrogenase
Some microorganisms utilize selenium in formate dehydrogenase. Formate is produced in large amounts in the hepatic (liver cells) mitochondria of embryonic cells and in cancer cells by the folate cycle.

Formate is reversibly oxidized by the enzyme formate dehydrogenase:
HCO2−  →   CO2  +  H+  +  2 e−

Thioredoxin reductase 
Thioredoxin reductase uses a cysteine-selenocysteine pair to reduce the disulfide in thioredoxin. The selenocysteine  is arranged in an unusual Sec-His-Glu catalytic triad, which tunes its pKa.

Indicator plants
Certain species of plants are considered indicators of high selenium content of the soil, since they require high levels of selenium to thrive. The main selenium indicator plants are Astragalus species (including some locoweeds), prince's plume (Stanleya sp.), woody asters (Xylorhiza sp.), and false goldenweed (Oonopsis sp.)

Medical use of synthetic selenium compounds
The substance loosely called selenium sulfide (with the approximate formula SeS2) is the active ingredient in some anti-dandruff shampoos. The selenium compound kills the scalp fungus Malassezia, which causes shedding of dry skin fragments. The ingredient is also used in body lotions to treat Tinea versicolor due to infection by a different species of Malassezia fungus.

Several clinical trials have assessed the use of selenium supplements in critically ill adults; however, the effectiveness and potential benefits of selenium supplementation in this context is not well understood.

Detection in biological fluids
Selenium may be measured in blood, plasma, serum or urine to monitor excessive environmental or occupational exposure, confirm a diagnosis of poisoning in hospitalized victims or to assist in a forensic investigation in a case of fatal overdosage. Some analytical techniques are capable of distinguishing organic from inorganic forms of the element. Both organic and inorganic forms of selenium are largely converted to monosaccharide conjugates (selenosugars) in the body prior to being eliminated in the urine. Cancer patients receiving daily oral doses of selenothionine may achieve very high plasma and urine selenium concentrations.

Toxicity
Although selenium is an essential trace element, it is toxic if taken in excess. Exceeding the Tolerable Upper Intake Level of 400 micrograms per day can lead to selenosis. This 400 microgram (µg) Tolerable Upper Intake Level is based primarily on a 1986 study of five Chinese patients who exhibited overt signs of selenosis and a follow up study on the same five people in 1992. The 1992 study actually found the maximum safe dietary Se intake to be approximately 800 micrograms per day (15 micrograms per kilogram body weight), but suggested 400 micrograms per day to not only avoid toxicity, but also to avoid creating an imbalance of nutrients in the diet and to account for data from other countries. In China, people who  ingested corn grown in extremely selenium-rich stony coal (carbonaceous shale) have suffered from selenium toxicity. This coal was shown to have selenium content as high as 9.1%, the highest concentration in coal ever recorded in literature.

Symptoms of selenosis include a garlic odor on the breath, gastrointestinal disorders, hair loss, sloughing of nails, fatigue, irritability, and neurological damage. Extreme cases of selenosis can result in cirrhosis of the liver, pulmonary edema, and death. Elemental selenium and most metallic selenides have relatively low toxicities because of their low bioavailability. By contrast, selenates and selenites are very toxic, having an oxidant mode of action similar to that of arsenic trioxide. The chronic toxic dose of selenite for humans is about 2400 to 3000 micrograms of selenium per day for a long time. Hydrogen selenide is an extremely toxic, corrosive gas. Selenium also occurs in organic compounds, such as dimethyl selenide, selenomethionine, selenocysteine and methylselenocysteine, all of which have high bioavailability and are toxic in large doses.

Selenium poisoning of water systems may result whenever new agricultural runoff courses through normally dry, undeveloped lands. This process leaches natural soluble selenium compounds (such as selenates) into the water, which may then be concentrated in new "wetlands" as the water evaporates. High selenium levels produced in this fashion have been found to have caused certain congenital disorders in wetland birds.

In fish and other wildlife, low levels of selenium cause deficiency while high levels cause toxicity.  For example, in salmon, the optimal concentration of selenium in the fish tissue (whole body) is about 1 microgram selenium per gram of tissue (dry weight).  At levels much below that concentration, young salmon die from selenium deficiency; much above that level they die from toxic excess.

Deficiency

Selenium deficiency can occur in patients with severely compromised intestinal function, those undergoing total parenteral nutrition, and in those of advanced age (over 90). Also, people dependent on food grown from selenium-deficient soil are at risk. Although New Zealand has low levels of selenium in its soil, adverse health effects have not been detected.

Selenium deficiency as defined by low (<60% of normal) selenoenzyme activity levels in brain and endocrine tissues only occurs when a low selenium status is linked with an additional stress, such as high exposures to mercury or as a result of increased oxidant stress due to vitamin E deficiency.

Selenium interacts with other nutrients, such as iodide and vitamin E. The interaction is observed in the etiology of many deficiency diseases in animals, and pure selenium deficiency is rare. The effect of selenium deficiency on health remains uncertain, particularly in relation to Kashin-Beck disease.

Dietary recommendations
The US Institute of Medicine (IOM) updated Estimated Average Requirements (EARs) and Recommended Dietary Allowances (RDAs) for selenium in 2000. If there is not sufficient information to establish EARs and RDAs, an estimate designated Adequate Intake (AI) is used instead. The current EAR for selenium for people ages 14 and up is 45 μg/day. The RDA is 55 μg/day. RDAs are higher than EARs so as to identify amounts that will cover people with higher than average requirements. RDA for pregnancy is 60 μg/day. RDA for lactation is 70 μg/day. For children ages 1–13 years the RDA increases with age from 20 to 40 μg/day. As for safety, the IOM sets Tolerable upper intake levels (ULs) for vitamins and minerals when evidence is sufficient. In the case of selenium the UL is 400 μg/day. Collectively the EARs, RDAs, AIs and ULs are referred to as Dietary Reference Intakes (DRIs).

The European Food Safety Authority (EFSA) refers to the collective set of information as Dietary Reference Values, with Population Reference Intake (PRI) instead of RDA, and Average Requirement instead of EAR. AI and UL defined the same as in United States. For women and men ages 15 and older the AI is set at 70 μg/day. AI for pregnancy is 70 μg/day, for lactation 85 μg/day. For children ages 1–14 years the AIs increase with age from 15 to 55 μg/day. These AIs are higher than the U.S. RDAs. The European Food Safety Authority reviewed the same safety question and set its UL at 300 μg/day, which is lower than the U.S. value.

In the United States, selenium deficiency is not common. A federal survey of food consumption determined that for women and men over the age of 19, average consumption from foods and beverages was 89 and 125 μg/day, respectively. For women and men of all ages fewer than 3% consumed less than the EAR.

Labeling
For US food and dietary supplement labeling purposes the amount in a serving is expressed as a percent of Daily Value (%DV). For selenium labeling purposes 100% of the Daily Value was 70 μg, but as of May 27, 2016 it was revised to 55 μg. A table of the old and new adult daily values is provided at Reference Daily Intake.

Food sources
Dietary selenium comes from nuts, cereals, meat, mushrooms, fish, and eggs. Brazil nuts are the richest ordinary dietary source and could cause selenium toxicity if consumed regularly – though the actual concentration of selenium (as with any plant-based food sources, such as another selenium-accumulating "paradise nut" Lecythis, belonging to the same family Lecythidaceae) is soil-dependent and may vary significantly by geographic location. In descending order of concentration, high levels are also found in kidney, tuna, crab, and lobster.

The human body's content of selenium is believed to be in the 13–20 milligram range.

Human health

Selenium in cancer

Selenium has bimodal biological action depending on the concentration. At low nutritional doses, selenium acts as an antioxidant through selenoproteins, scavenging ROS, supporting cell survival and growth; while, at supra-nutritional higher pharmacological doses, selenium acts as a pro-oxidant generating ROS and inducing cell death. In cancer, studies have been conducted mostly on the benefits of selenium intake in reducing the risk of cancer incidence at the nutritional level; however, fewer studies have explored the effects of supra-nutritional or pharmacological doses of selenium on cancer.

"Although an inverse association between selenium exposure and the risk of some types of cancer was found in some observational studies, this cannot be taken as evidence of a causal relation, and these results should be interpreted with caution... Conflicting results including inverse, null and direct associations have been reported for some cancer types... RCTs assessing the effects of selenium supplementation on cancer risk have yielded inconsistent results... To date, no convincing evidence suggests that selenium supplements can prevent cancer in humans."

Selenium in anti-tumour immunity 
To date, many studies have been conducted on the benefits of selenium intake in reducing the risk of cancer incidence at the nutritional level, indicating that likely selenium functions as an immunostimulator, i.e. reversing the immunosuppression in tumour microenvironment towards antitumour immunity by activating immune cells (e.g. M1 macrophages and CD8+ T-lymphocytes, the elevated number of neutrophils and activated cytotoxic NK cells) and releasing pro-inflammatory cytokines such as IFNγ and TNFα.

HIV/AIDS
AIDS appears to involve a slow and progressive decline in levels of selenium in the body. Whether this decline in selenium levels is a direct result of the replication of HIV or related more generally to the overall malabsorption of nutrients by AIDS patients remains debated. Observational studies have found an association between decreased selenium levels and poorer outcomes in patients with HIV, though these studies were mostly done prior to the currently effective treatments with highly active antiretroviral therapy (HAART).  Currently there is inadequate evidence to recommend routine selenium supplementation for HIV patients, and further research is recommended.

Mortality
Selenium supplementation has no effect on overall mortality.

Tuberculosis
As with other types of supplementation, there is no good evidence selenium supplementation helps in the treatment of tuberculosis.

Diabetes

A meta-analysis of four RCTs concluded that there is no support for selenium supplementation for prevention of type 2 diabetes mellitus in Caucasians.

Human reproductive system
Abnormally high or low levels of dietary selenium can have an adverse effect on sperm quality, with a consequent lowering of fertility.

COVID-19
During the COVID-19 pandemic, some studies tried to correlate between selenium plasma level and severity of COVID-19 cases. 
One study done on 33 patients concluded that low plasma selenium levels were correlated with a high mortality rate among COVID-19 patients. However, the median age of deaths in this study was 89 years old; in contrast, survivors' median age was 69 years old, and the study stated that the causality remains unknown.  
On the other hand, another study revealed that the mean selenium plasma level was within the normal range among all included COVID-19 patients; however, the mean selenium plasma level was elevated among severe cases of COVID-19. This study concluded that there was a significant elevation of selenium serum level among severe cases compared to non-severe cases of COVID-19, and could be correlated with the disease severity.

Mercury poisoning 
Selenium has a protective effect towards mercury toxicity. Mercury binds to selenium with high affinity, so this metal can inhibit selenium-dependent enzymes. However, increased selenium intake can preserve the enzyme activities, reducing the adverse effects caused by mercury exposition.

Evolution in biology and biosynthetic considerations

Selenium is incorporated into several prokaryotic selenoprotein families in bacteria, archaea, and eukaryotes as selenocysteine, where selenoprotein peroxiredoxins protect bacterial and eukaryotic cells against oxidative damage. Selenoprotein families of GSH-Px and the deiodinases of eukaryotic cells seem to have a bacterial phylogenetic origin. The selenocysteine-containing form occurs in species as diverse as green algae, diatoms, sea urchin, fish and chicken. Selenium enzymes are involved in utilization of the small reducing molecules glutathione and thioredoxin.

Trace elements involved in GSH-Px and superoxide dismutase enzymes activities, i.e. selenium, vanadium, magnesium, copper, and zinc, may have been lacking in some terrestrial mineral-deficient areas. Marine organisms retained and sometimes expanded their seleno-proteomes, whereas the seleno-proteomes of some terrestrial organisms were reduced or completely lost. These findings suggest that aquatic life supports selenium utilization, whereas terrestrial habitats lead to reduced use of this trace element. Marine fishes and vertebrate thyroid glands have the highest concentration of selenium and iodine. From about 500 Mya, freshwater and terrestrial plants slowly optimized the production of "new" endogenous antioxidants such as ascorbic acid (Vitamin C), polyphenols (including flavonoids), tocopherols, etc. A few of these appeared more recently, in the last 50–200 million years, in fruits and flowers of angiosperm plants. In fact, the angiosperms (the dominant type of plant today) and most of their antioxidant pigments evolved during the late Jurassic period.

About 200 Mya, new selenoproteins were developed as mammalian GSH-Px enzymes.

See also

 Biology and pharmacology of chemical elements

References

External links

WebElements – Selenium
NIH – Selenium Fact Sheet for Consumers
Assay – Supra-Regional Assay Service
ATSDR – Toxicological Profile for Selenium
Elementymology & Elements Multidict – Selenium page by Peter van der Krogt

Antioxidants
Biological systems
Biology and pharmacology of chemical elements
Chalcogens
Dietary minerals
Nutrition
Selenium